Anthony Earl Cherry was a running back in the Canadian Football League with the B.C. Lions. He was selected in the 1986 NFL Draft by the San Francisco 49ers in the ninth round (240th pick) out of the University of Oregon. He is distinguished as being the first Libyan to play in the National Football League. Cherry height is 5'7.

References

Canadian football running backs
San Francisco 49ers players
BC Lions players
Calgary Stampeders players
Ottawa Rough Riders players
Oregon Ducks football players
1963 births
Living people
Place of birth missing (living people)
National Football League replacement players